Halobacteroides elegans is a strictly anaerobic and halophilic bacterium from the genus of Halobacteroides.

References

Clostridia
Bacteria described in 1997